is a Japanese international football player currently playing for Gamba Osaka in the J1 League. His regular playing position is an attacking midfielder or a winger.

Club career

A native of Osaka, Kurata came up through the youth team ranks at Gamba Osaka and made his way into the first-team squad ahead of the 2007 season.   Owing to his tender years, he played just 6 league matches in his debut season as a professional, but the following year he went on to make 21 appearances in all competitions as Gamba lifted the 2008 AFC Champions League and the 2008 Emperor's Cup.   The Osaka giants retained their Emperor's Cup title in 2009, however Kurata only featured 4 times throughout the year as he struggled to break into their star-studded starting line-up.

To gain more first-team experience he was sent out on loan, first to J2 League side JEF United in 2010 and then to city rivals Cerezo Osaka in 2011.   He netted an impressive 10 goals in 33 league games with Cerezo and this form was enough to earn him a recall to Gamba's first-team in 2012.   His first season back in north Osaka saw Gamba finish 17th in J1 League which sent them down to Japan's second tier for the first time in their history.   Kurata netted 8 times in 28 J2 appearances in 2013 as Gamba bounced back at the first time of asking, securing the league title with 87 points from 42 games.

2014 was a dream for Gamba as not only did they return to Japan's top flight but they also helped themselves to a domestic treble; lifting the J1 title as well as the J.League Cup and Emperor's Cup.   Kurata scored 11 goals in 47 appearances in all competitions, a personal best for him in the blue and black of Gamba.   The men from Suita added the 2015 Japanese Super Cup and 2015 Emperor's Cup titles to their haul from the previous year, defeating Urawa Red Diamonds in the final of both competitions, and also reached the semi-finals of the AFC Champions League before going down to Chinese side Guangzhou Evergrande over two legs.   Kurata played 55 times in all competitions and found the back of the net on 8 occasions.

Gamba failed to lift any silverware between 2016 and 2018, however Kurata remained an integral part of the side, missing just 4 league games across the 3 seasons and scoring 14 times.

International career

On 23 July 2015, Japan's coach Vahid Halilhodžić called him up for the upcoming 2015 EAFF East Asian Cup. He earned his first international cap in a 1-1 draw with China on August 5.   His next national team involvement would come as a second half substitute in Japan's 2-0 victory away to the United Arab Emirates in March 2017.   He followed that up by playing both games in Japan's double header against Syria and Iraq in June with both matches finishing 1-1.

October 2017 would prove to be a high point in his international career as he scored in both the 2-1 friendly victory over New Zealand on October 6 and the 3-3 draw at home to Haiti 4 days later.

He was named in the squad for the 2017 EAFF E-1 Football Championship in December 2017 and started all 3 of Japan's games; the victories over North Korea and China as well as the 4-1 defeat to South Korea in the decisive match of the tournament which saw Japan finish as runners-up.

Club statistics

.

 1 includes FIFA Club World Cup appearances and 2 includes J. League Championship, Japanese Super Cup and Suruga Bank Championship appearances.

National team statistics
Last Update:6 February 2019

International goals
Scores and results list Japan's goal tally first.

Honours
Updated to 2018 season.
AFC Champions League - 2008
Pan-Pacific Championship - 2008
J. League Division 1 - 2014
J. League Division 2 - 2013
Emperor's Cup - 2008, 2009, 2014, 2015
J. League Cup - 2007, 2014
Japanese Super Cup - 2015

References

External links

 
 
Profile at Gamba Osaka
 

1988 births
Living people
Association football people from Osaka Prefecture
People from Takatsuki, Osaka
Japanese footballers
Japan international footballers
J1 League players
J2 League players
Gamba Osaka players
JEF United Chiba players
Cerezo Osaka players
Association football midfielders